136 may refer to:

136 (number)
AD 136
136 BC
136 (MBTA bus)